Julie Oksbjerg (born 2 December 2000) is a Danish ice hockey player and member of the Danish national ice hockey team, currently playing with the Odense IK Kvinder of the KvindeLigaen.

Oksbjerg represented Denmark at the Division I Group A tournaments of the IIHF Women's World Championship in 2017, 2018, and 2019, and at the Top Division tournament in 2021. As a junior player with the Danish national under-18 team, she participated in the Division I Qualification tournament of the IIHF Women's U18 World Championship in 2015, the Division I tournament in 2016, and the Division I Group B tournaments in 2017 and 2018.

References

External links
 

Living people
2000 births
Danish women's ice hockey forwards
Danish ice hockey right wingers
Ice hockey players at the 2022 Winter Olympics
Olympic ice hockey players of Denmark